Ballykelly is a village and townland in County Londonderry, Northern Ireland. It is designated as a Large Village and in 2011 the population of Ballykelly was 2,107. It lies within Causeway Coast and Glens district.

Features
Ballykelly contains some of the most interesting buildings erected in Ulster by the Plantation companies, being largely developed by the London Company of Fishmongers through the 18th and 19th centuries. It features Tamlaghtfinlagan Parish Church, built by Earl Frederick Hervey, 18th-century Bishop of Derry, amongst many traditional buildings. The Presbyterian Church, Drummond Hotel and North West Independent Hospital, were all built by the London Company of Fishmongers. The village enjoys views across Lough Foyle to Inishowen in County Donegal and is bordered by Ballykelly Forest which was the first State Forest in Northern Ireland.

Politics
The village lies within the East Londonderry constituency and is represented by Democratic Unionist Party (DUP) member, Gregory Campbell.

History
The village was originally laid out as a Plantation settlement. The development of the nearby World War II airfield greatly enhanced the size and significance of the village.

RAF Ballykelly opened in 1941 as an airfield  RAF Coastal Command and closed in 1971, because of the British Government's defence cuts.  The station was transferred to the British Army, who renamed it Shackleton Barracks.  The Army was due to leave Shackleton Barracks in early 2008. During World War II an RAF bomber aeroplane on a training run clipped a telephone line behind a church in Ballykelly and crashed, claiming the lives of the crew.  The aircraft was carrying out a trials mission involving low level parachuting, but a parachute became entangled with the tailplane, putting the aircraft out of control.

During the Northern Irish Troubles the Droppin Well bombing occurred in Ballykelly, killing 17 people in a local disco and bar. Although one of the most fatal single incidents of the conflict, it was the only fatal Troubles-related incident to take place in Ballykelly.

Places of interest

Ballykelly Forest is located west of the village. Also known as the Camman Wood, it was a popular haunt for highwaymen terrorising the coach road from Coleraine to Derry. 
Between Limavady and Ballykelly is Rough Fort, one of the best preserved earthworks in the province.
Nearby is Sampson's Tower, a fortified structure built by public subscription in memory of Arthur Sampson who for 40 years was an agent of the London Worshipful Company of Fishmongers.
The village hosts Shackleton Barracks, which became famous when a commercial airliner on a Ryanair service landed there by mistake on 29 March 2006, instead of at City of Derry Airport.
Behind the Kings Lane Estate there are the remains of the Lough Shore Base Line trigpoint. This is one of three towers created to verify a mapping baseline for Ireland. ,

Demography
Ballykelly is classified as a village by the Northern Ireland Statistics and Research Agency (NISRA) (i.e., with a population of between 1,000 and 2,250 people). On Census day (27 March 2011) there were 2,107 people living in Ballykelly. Of these:
23.26% were aged under 16 and 9.63% were aged 65 and over
50.17% of the population were male and 49.83% were female
58.33% were from a Catholic background and 38.59% were from a Protestant or other Christian background
8.55% of people aged 16–74 were unemployed.

Climate 
Ballykelly has an oceanic climate (Cfb) with mild summers and cool winters.

Transport
Ballykelly has good road links to Derry and Limavady. Construction is now "on hold until 2020".
The Broharris Canal was constructed in the 1820s.
Ballykelly railway station opened on 29 December 1852 and closed on 20 September 1954. There are currently no rail links serving Ballykelly, although the Derry to Belfast railway line runs nearby.

Sport
Gaelic football is played at Glack GAC which encompasses players from Ballykelly and the Glack area. 
Camogie is also played at Glack GAC for ladies.
The Nedd CC is the local cricket team in Ballykelly, and currently play in Senior League 2 of the North West Cricket Union.

Education
Ballykelly Primary School
St. Finlough's Primary School, Glack, Ballykelly

Religion

The village is recorded in Papal Bulls of the mid-12th century. The name Tamlaghtfinlagan comes from the Irish for "the resting place of Finliganus", one of Columba's monks who was, according to tradition, the founding abbot of the abbey. This abbey building still exists, although in ruins. In the mid-16th century the parish church moved to Walworth. In 1689 it was gutted by the retreating troops of James II following the defeat in the Battle of the Boyne. The current edifice was dedicated in 1795, and is a simple perpendicular church, with three aisles, a small chancel and a gallery, much of which was built by the Worshipful Company of Fishmongers.

Ballykelly Presbyterian Church was built in 1827 by the Fishmongers Company, London and is a listed grade A building. It has a growing congregation of over 240 families.
Saint Finlough's Catholic Church dates from 1849.

Notable people
 Sally Brown, Paralympic athlete, hails from Ballykelly.

References

External links
BBC Your Place and Mine: Ballykelly, Co. Derry - A Model Plantation Village

Villages in County Londonderry
Plantations (settlements or colonies)
Causeway Coast and Glens district